Kingston This Week is a community advertising flyer that publishes once a week in the Kingston, Ontario region. The tabloid has a circulation of 48,500 every Thursday and is delivered directly to homes.

History

The flyer has been distributed to homes in the community of 132,000 since the early 1970s, when it began as the Kingston News, was renamed the Shoppers News and then, with an expanded editorial department, became Kingston This Week by 1980.

The flyer features local people, events and points of interest; providing news, features and sports coverage as a platform for advertising.

See also
List of newspapers in Canada

External links
 The Kingston This Week Official Website
 

Postmedia Network publications
Weekly newspapers published in Ontario
Newspapers published in Kingston, Ontario
Publications with year of establishment missing